KRMG may refer to:

KRMG (AM), a radio station (740 AM) licensed to Tulsa, Oklahoma, United States
KRMG-FM, a radio station (102.3 FM) licensed to Sand Springs, Oklahoma, United States
Richard B. Russell Airport, an airport in Rome, Georgia, United States, assigned the ICAO code KRMG